Assurance is an unincorporated community in Monroe County, West Virginia, United States.

The name Assurance was selected by postal officials.

References

Unincorporated communities in Monroe County, West Virginia
Unincorporated communities in West Virginia